Walter Dunham Claus (6 March 1903 – 12 May 1995) was an American biophysicist who worked in radiation biology and medical physics.

Early life and education
He was born in St. Louis, Missouri and died in Golden, Jefferson County, Colorado. Claus's father Ernest Claus was from Germany and his mother Laura Claus was from Missouri. They resided at 310 N. Stein in St. Louis, Missouri.
In 1931 received his Ph.D. in Physics from Washington University in St. Louis, for a doctoral thesis titled Effect of Temperature on the Diffuse Scattering of X-rays from Rock Salt. From 1931 through 1933, Claus continued to study X-ray effects as a National Research Council fellow. He then worked at the Mellon Institute and eventually joined the Atomic Energy Commission.

Career

Atomic Energy Commission
In 1954, Claus oversaw the testing of samples from the Marshall Islands for radioactive fallout from the Castle Bravo explosion. From 1949-1955 he held the position of Chief in the Division of Biology and Medicine, AEC. Then from 1955-1967 he served as Special Assistant to Division Director, AEC.

Health Physics Society
Claus was a key member in the formation of the Health Physics Society and represented the U.S. Atomic Energy Commission. In 1955, he was one of the founding members and part of the initial board of directors. He would also serve as the society's president during 1961 and 1962.

Publications
Health Effects of Plutonium and Radium.
Interpretation of Atomic Structure Factor Curves in Crystal Reflection of X-Rays.
The bactericidal effect of ultraviolet radiation on Escherichia coli in liquid suspensions.
An experimental study of the problem of mitogenetic radiation.
What is Health Physics?
Radiation Biology and Medicine
Symposium on Education and Training in Health Physics: Training Programs in Health Physics.

References

1995 deaths
Radiobiologists
20th-century American physicists
Nuclear Regulatory Commission officials
Washington University in St. Louis alumni
Washington University physicists
Physicists from Missouri
Scientists from St. Louis
Scientists from Missouri
Nuclear physicists
Claus, Walter Dunham
1903 births
Medical physicists
Health Physics Society